Northern Samar's 1st congressional district is a congressional district in the province of Northern Samar, Philippines. It has been represented in the House of Representatives since 1987. The district covers the province's western half which contains its capital, Catarman, the adjacent municipalities of Allen, Bobon, Lavezares, Lope de Vega, Mondragon, Rosario, San Isidro, San Jose and Victoria, and the San Bernardino Strait island municipalities of Biri, Capul, San Antonio and San Vicente. It is currently represented in the 19th Congress by Paul R. Daza of the National Unity Party (NUP).

Representation history

Election results

2022

2019

2016

2013

2010

See also
Legislative districts of Northern Samar

References

Congressional districts of the Philippines
Politics of Northern Samar
1987 establishments in the Philippines
Congressional districts of Eastern Visayas
Constituencies established in 1987